The Village has improved its Underdevelopment progress from Economical state with the help of new Political Party (Tehreek-e-Insaf) after previous Initiatives taken by (PMLN).

This Village would be a medium for Railways Network of CPEC (China Pakistan Economic Corridor) along with expected (Havelian DryPort Project)  being built in the vicinity of Baldhair Railway Station about five kilometres from Haripur city and is designed to meet the demand of the containerized future freight traffic between China and Pakistan under the China-Pakistan Economic Corridor (CPEC)

References 

Union councils of Haripur District
Populated places in Haripur District